Kurī is the Māori name for the extinct Polynesian dog. It was introduced to New Zealand by the Polynesian ancestors of the Māori during their migration from East Polynesia in the 13th century AD. According to Māori tradition, the demigod Māui transformed his brother-in-law Irawaru into the first dog.

Description 
Kurī were bushy-tailed, with short legs and powerful shoulders. Their coat colour ranged from yellowish brown to black, white, or spotted. Like other Polynesian dog breeds, they howled instead of barked – the Māori word for the howl was auau.

Use 
Kurī were a source of food for Māori, and considered a delicacy. British explorer James Cook sampled kurī on his 1769 voyage and declared that it was almost as tasty as lamb.

Kurī were also used to hunt birds. In addition, Māori used their skins and fur to make dog-skin cloaks (kahu kurī), belts, weapon decorations and poi.

Extinction 
Kurī were seen widely across New Zealand during Cook's first voyage in 1769. The kurī became extinct in New Zealand in the 1860s, following the arrival of European settlers; the breed was unable to survive interbreeding with European dogs. The remains of the last known specimens, a female and her pup, are now in the collection of the Museum of New Zealand Te Papa Tongarewa.

See also 
Hawaiian Poi Dog – breed of Polynesian dog native to Hawaii
List of dog breeds
List of extinct dog breeds
Tahitian Dog – breed of Polynesian dog native to Tahiti in the Society Islands
Marquesan Dog – breed of Polynesian dog native to the Marquesas Islands

References

Further reading

Allo Bay-Peter en. J. L. 1979. The role of the dog in the economy of the New Zealand Maori. In Anderson. A. J. (Ed). Birds of a Feather: Osteological and Archaeological papers from the South Pacific in honour of R. J. Scarlett: 165- 181. British Archaeological Records. International Series 62.

Clark, Geoffrey R. (1995). The Kuri in Prehistory: a Skeletal Analysis of the Extinct Maori Dog. MA thesis, Anthropology Department, University of Otago

Extinct dog breeds
Extinct animals of New Zealand
Dog meat
Polynesian Dog
Mammals of New Zealand
Dog breeds originating in New Zealand